De Vriendschap  is a 2000 Dutch film.

Cast

External links 
 

Dutch comedy-drama films
2000 films
2000s Dutch-language films